Musique(s) électronique(s) : les bruitistes et leur descendance is a documentary film shot between 2010 and 2012 by  filmmaker Jérémie Carboni.

Summary 
Musique(s) électronique(s) is a documentary about the history of electronic music, musique concrète, and experimental music, ranging from Luigi Russolo's 1913 manifesto The Art of Noises to the modern generation. Composers, including Jean Michel Jarre, Emilie Simon, François Bayle, Michel Chion, Christian Zanési, and Teho Teardo, discuss about how and why they composed electronic music pieces. The film's premiere was screened in Paris, on June 19, 2013, at the La Gaîté Lyrique theatre.

Cast
 Jean-Michel Jarre, electronic music composer.
 Émilie Simon, composer and French singer of electronic music.
 Moriarty, Stéphan Zimmerli (Moriarty's musician).
 Teho Teardo, composer.
 François Bayle, composer, former CEO of Groupe de Recherches Musicales (GRM).
 Christian Zanési, composer and CEO of GRM.
 Michel Chion, composer, musicologist and professor at the University of Paris III: Sorbonne Nouvelle.
 Frank Madlener, CEO of Ircam.
 Marc Battier, composer, co-founder of the Electroacoustic Music Studies (EMS and musicologist at the Sorbonne).

References

External links 
 

Musique concrète
2013 films
French documentary films
2013 documentary films
Documentary films about electronic music and musicians
Films directed by Jérémie Carboni
2010s French films